The 2001–02 season was the 78th season in the existence of AEK Athens F.C. and the 43rd consecutive season in the top flight of Greek football. They competed in the Alpha Ethniki, the Greek Cup and the UEFA Cup. The season began on 6 August 2001 and finished on 8 May 2002.

Overview

The summer of 2001 found AEK Athens once again in the midst of great administrative and financial problems. The multinationals ENIC and Netmed were looking all summer for interested parties to buy the or take over the management of the club. Eventually, the controversial businessman and well-known from his past in the basketball team, Makis Psomiadis, through the company "Ippoventure", became the new boss of AEK. Makis Psomiadis initially put in the position of president his friend and businessman, Filon Antonopoulos and later his cousin, Charilaos Psomiadis. In the competitive part, however, Psomiadis seemed to be quite capable. He brought as the team's coach, Fernando Santos, and added to the roster, the Paraguayan international defender, Carlos Gamarra, as a loan from Flamengo.

AEK started the championship very well and from an outsider they slowly became a favorite for the title, with Santos demonstrating a disciplined and well-done team. However, 3 consecutive defeats in January 2002 suddenly made the situation very difficult and the first problems in the Psomiadis-Santos relations begun. The team continued well, however, and competed with Olympiacos for the title race until the end. Finally, on 20 April 2002, a match that was deemed as "final", took place in Olympic Stadium for the penultimate matchday, where Olympiacos won 4–3 and conclusively AEK lost the title in a draw with 58 points each.

In the first round of the UEFA Cup, AEK had a theoretically easy task, having to face the weak Grevenmacher from Luxembourg. The first match took place at Nea Filadelfeia and AEK were storming. The 2 goals in the first half by Tsiartas and Zagorakis and another 4 in the second half by Nikolaidis and Lakis, gave an impressive victory to the yellow-blacks. The crowd was extremely satisfied and the rematch is now a completely formal procedure. It was worth noting that the opposing coach Herbert Herres declared after the match that AEK were one of the "10 best European teams". The rematch in Luxembourg was of a procedural nature. AEK didn't struggle at all with 1 goal in each half with Lakis and Konstantinidis, while also missing plenty of chances. The majority of AEK's fans at the stadium was remarkable. In the second round, AEK found the obstacle of the Scottish Hibernian. The coach of the Scots, Alex McLeish, declared AEK as the favorite from the beginning, but this remained to be seen on the field as well. The first match was played in Athens in front of about 18,000 people. AEK won a penalty with Georgeas at the 55th minute and Tsiartas capitalized on it. In the 68th minute, a header by Nikolaidis from a cross by Konstantinidis made it 2–0 and gave AEK a very good score for the second match. It was worth noting that with this goal, Demis Nikolaidis reached 17 goals for the UEFA Cup and became the Greek top scorer of all time for this competition. At the Easter Road, Hibernian pressed AEK, who were lucky to draw the first half 0–0. In the second half, however, 2 goals by Luna equalized the score of the first match and the game went to overtime, where the class of Tsiartas "spoke", who with 2 personal goals with a shot and a direct corner kick, essentially gave AEK the qualification. All the Scots managed to do was to score a third goal 5 minutes before the end of extra time, just getting an honorable victory with 3–2. In the round of 48, the draw again favored AEK, who found in front of them another "passable" opponent, the Croatian Osijek. In the first match in Croatia, AEK entered the game strongly and took the lead in the 12th minute with Zagorakis, while in the 70th minute Nikolaidis made it 0–2, but immediately after that the Croatian team reduced it to 1–2. AEK kept the score in their favor until the end and was the clear favorite for qualification. In the second leg in Athens, AEK soon found themselves behind with a 15th-minute own goal by Ferrugem, but turned the score around to be leveled by the Croatian side at 2-2 before half-time. Finally, a goal by Konstantinidis in the 79th minute, gave the yellow-blacks the qualification. In the next round, another theoretically passable opponent was drawn against AEK, the Bulgarian Litex Lovech. The first match took place at Nikos Goumas Stadium and AEK came in impressively from the start and scoring 3 goals by the 23rd minute, and with the Bulgarians reducing it to 3–1 in the 30th minute. In the second half, AEK conceded another goal for the final 3–2 and the Bulgarians to re-enter the qualification game for good. In the rematch in frozen Lovech, AEK was called upon to qualify in a match that took place in very difficult weather conditions. A goal by their top player in the match, Gamara, just in the 6th minute, directly brought AEK a "hug" with the qualification, who eventually conceded a goal at the end of the match, even though they had already qualified. AEK had now reached the 16th of the institution and the margins for passable draws had narrowed. They were eventually drawn with the mighty Internazionale and things became extremely difficult. The first match at Stadio Giuseppe Meazza started impressively for AEK, which were ahead in the score in the 8th minute with a great shot by Zagorakis. However, the Italian team quickly recovered and with two goals from Zanetti and Kallon made it 2–1 before the break, while the superiority of the Italians was then sealed with another goal in the 56th minute from Ventola. The rematch was indeed difficult. In a packed Nikos Goumas Stadium, AEK tried to press, but in their first chance of Inter conceaded a goal with free-kick by Greško in the 20th minute. AEK equalized after 3 minutes with a header by Konstantinidis and overturned the score with Nikolaidis at the 56th minute making the crowd heated as it brings the team just one goal away from extra time, but the experienced and quality Italian team, immediately equalized with Ventola, which made the final 2–2. AEK's European course ended there, with a elimination with their "heads up".

In the Cup, AEK initially qualified by playing in a group with Panserraikos, Egaleo, and Nafpaktiakos Asteras. After an easy qualification over Agios Nikolaos, the next obstacle was Kilkisiakos and an even easier victory for the yellow-blacks. In the quarter-finals, AEK faced PAOK. In the first leg in Nikos Goumas Stadium, AEK prevailed with 2–1. The rematch of Toumba Stadium seemed difficult, but in the end it turned out to be a "strawl" with AEK winning with 0–4. In the semi-finals, AEK was drawn against Skoda Xanthi. The first match in the Xanthi ended with 0–0 and AEK showed the absolute favorite for the rematch. In the end, the Xanthi team proved to be "tougher", the match ended 0–0 and went to extra time. There, however, a goal by Ilija Ivić in the 106th minute gave AEK the qualification for the final, where Olympiacos were waiting for them. The Cup final took place a week after the "championship final" and beyond its given importance, it was AEK's opportunity for a revenge. The match was very strong from the start and despite the chances, the first-half ended 0–0. In the 51st minute, Nikolaidis won a penalty for AEK. Tsiartas executed it, the ball hit the two posts, reached Nikolaidis who shot, and after going against the body of Konstantinidis, ended up in the net. Olympiacos then pushed for the equalizer and finally succeeded in the 70th minute with a header by Giovanni, who was sent off 9 minutes later for an unsportsmanlike hit on Konstantinidis. In the 81st minute, Ilija Ivić entered the match and 2 minutes later, after a foul by Tsiartas he scored the winning goal with a header and AEK won the title.

The top scorer of the season for the "two-headed" in the championship was Nikolaidis with 17 goals, while Tsiartas scored 16 goals. The presence of the amazing Gamarra in defense was also noteworthy.

Players

Squad information

NOTE: The players are the ones that have been announced by the AEK Athens' press release. No edits should be made unless a player arrival or exit is announced. Updated 30 June 2002, 23:59 UTC+3.

Transfers

In

Summer

Winter

Out

Summer

Winter

Loan in

Summer

Winter

Loan out

Summer

Winter

Renewals

Overall transfer activity

Expenditure
Summer:  €2,400,000

Winter:  €0

Total:  €2,400,000

Income
Summer:  €0

Winter:  €0

Total:  €0

Net Totals
Summer:  €2,400,000

Winter:  €0

Total:  €2,400,000

Pre-season and friendlies

Alpha Ethniki

League table

Results summary

Results by Matchday

Fixtures

Greek Cup

Group 1

Matches

Second round

Round of 16

Quarter-finals

Semi-finals

Final

UEFA Cup

Qualifying round

First round

Second round

Third round

Fourth round

Statistics

Squad statistics

! colspan="13" style="background:#FFDE00; text-align:center" | Goalkeepers
|-

! colspan="13" style="background:#FFDE00; color:black; text-align:center;"| Defenders
|-

! colspan="13" style="background:#FFDE00; color:black; text-align:center;"| Midfielders
|-

! colspan="13" style="background:#FFDE00; color:black; text-align:center;"| Forwards
|-

! colspan="13" style="background:#FFDE00; color:black; text-align:center;"| Left during Winter Transfer Window
|-

|-
|}

Disciplinary record

|-
! colspan="17" style="background:#FFDE00; text-align:center" | Goalkeepers

|-
! colspan="17" style="background:#FFDE00; color:black; text-align:center;"| Defenders

|-
! colspan="17" style="background:#FFDE00; color:black; text-align:center;"| Midfielders

|-
! colspan="17" style="background:#FFDE00; color:black; text-align:center;"| Forwards

|-
! colspan="17" style="background:#FFDE00; color:black; text-align:center;"| Left during Winter Transfer window

|-
|}

Starting 11

References

External links
AEK Athens F.C. Official Website

2001-02
Greek football clubs 2001–02 season